Libero Calcio Nuova Gioiese is an Italian football club based in Gioia Tauro, Calabria. Currently it plays in Italy's Serie D.

History

Gioiese 
The first Gioiese was founded in 1918, and its colours was white and blue with stripes. The then president was Ugo Battaglini.

Serie C 
The first experience Gioiese had of such level occurred after World War II, when he participated in Serie C known as Lega Interregionale South until 1948.

Serie C2 
With president Franco Musco Gioiese played at first at the Campionato Interregionale 1981–1982 with coach Franco Scoglio and won the championship by dominating from the first to the last day.

After the departure of Scoglio, the Gioiese prepared for next season in Serie C2 with a new coach Bruno Jacoboni, but the results came negative, with a relegation on the final day, despite beating Messina.

Libero Calcio Nuova Gioiese 
The old Gioiese dissolved in 2004, overwhelmed by debts. So the first team of Gioia Tauro became Libero Calcio Nuova Gioiese, a team born in 1968 and which, under the leadership of president Rombolà, make a big climb from Seconda Categoria to Eccellenza.

Serie D 
In the season 2012–13 the team was promoted from Eccellenza Calabria to Serie D.

Colors and badge 
The team's colors are purple and white.

References

External links 
  

Football clubs in Calabria
Association football clubs established in 1968
1968 establishments in Italy